Twins of Suffering Creek is a 1920 American silent Western film directed by Scott R. Dunlap and starring William Russell, Louise Lovely, E. Alyn Warren, William Ryno, and Henry Hebert. It is based on 1912 novel of the same name by Ridgwell Cullum. The film was released by Fox Film Corporation in June 1920.

Cast
 William Russell as Bill Lark
 Louise Lovely as Little Casino
 E. Alyn Warren as Scipio Jones (as E.A. Warren)
 William Ryno as Minky Clark (as Billy Rhyno)
 Henry Hebert as Jim Pemberton (as Henry J. Herbert)
 Joe Ray as Sunny Oak
 Florence Deshon as Jess Jones
 Malcolm Cripe as Twin Boy
 Helen Stone as Twin Girl

Preservation
The film is now considered lost.

See also
 List of lost films
 1937 Fox vault fire

References

External links
 

1920 films
1920 Western (genre) films
1920s romance films
American black-and-white films
American romance films
Films based on British novels
Fox Film films
Lost American films
Silent American Western (genre) films
Twins in fiction
1920s American films
1920s English-language films